The Philadelphia Wings were a lacrosse team based in Philadelphia playing in the National Lacrosse League (NLL). The 2014 season was the 28th in franchise history and the final season in Philadelphia. After this season, the Wings relocated to Uncasville, Connecticut, to become the New England Black Wolves.

Regular season

Current standings

Game log
Reference:

Roster

Transactions

Trades

See also
2014 NLL season

References

Philadelphia Wings seasons
2014 in lacrosse
Philadelphia Wings